"I Got Rhythm" is a piece composed by George Gershwin with lyrics by Ira Gershwin and published in 1930, which became a jazz standard.  Its chord progression, known as the "rhythm changes", is the foundation for many other popular jazz tunes such as Charlie Parker's and Dizzy Gillespie's bebop standard "Anthropology (Thrivin' on a Riff)".

Composition 
The song came from the musical Girl Crazy, which also includes two other hit songs, "Embraceable You" and "But Not for Me", and has been sung by many jazz singers since. It was originally written as a slow song for Treasure Girl (1928) and found another, faster setting in Girl Crazy. Ethel Merman sang the song in the original Broadway production and Broadway lore holds that George Gershwin, after seeing her opening reviews, warned her never to take a singing lesson.

The four-note opening riff bears a striking resemblance to the opening melody of the third movement of William Grant Still's Symphony No. 1, "Afro-American." In the 1920s, Still played in the pit orchestra for Shuffle Along, and speculated that Gershwin may have borrowed the melody from his improvisations in the pit, which were later used in his own symphony. 

The piece was originally penned in the key of D major. The song melody uses four notes of the five-note pentatonic scale, first rising, then falling. A rhythmic interest in the song is that the tune keeps behind the main pulse, with the three "I got..." phrases syncopated, appearing one beat behind in the first bar, while the fourth phase "Who could..." rushes in to the song. The song's chorus is in a 34-bar AABA form. Its chord progression (although often reduced to a standard 32-bar structure for the sake of improvised solos) is known as the "rhythm changes" and is the foundation for many other popular jazz tunes. The song was used as the theme in Gershwin's last concert piece for piano and orchestra, Variations on "I Got Rhythm", written in 1934. The song has become symbolic of the Gershwins, of swing and of the 1920s.

As usual, George Gershwin wrote the melody first and gave it to Ira to set, but Ira found it an unusually hard melody for which to compose lyrics. He experimented for two weeks with the rhyme scheme he felt the music called for — sets of triple rhymes — but found that the heavy rhyming "seemed at best to give a pleasant and jingly Mother Goose quality to a tune which should throw its weight around more". Finally, he began to experiment with leaving most of the lines unrhymed. "This approach felt stronger," he wrote, "and I finally arrived at the present refrain, with only 'more-door' and 'mind him-find him' the rhymes." He added that this approach "was a bit daring for me who usually depended on rhyme insurance".

Ira also wrote that, although the phrase "Who could ask for anything more?" is repeated four times in the song, he decided not to make it the title because "somehow the first line of the refrain sounded more arresting and provocative".

Disputed authorship
In 1987 Judith Anne Still, the daughter of William Grant Still, wrote in a letter that Gershwin stole the song from her father.
 ... my father said that Gershwin came to the Negro shows in Harlem to get his inspiration, stealing melodies wholesale from starving minority composers and then passing them off as his own. "I Got Rhythm" was my father's creation, according to Eubie Blake.

 History 
The song was included in the Gershwin brothers' 1931 Broadway musical Of Thee I Sing.The meaning of this song is how she was perfectly fine with her life and loved how it was going no matter what.

An instrumental arrangement for piano and orchestra appears in the 1945 Hollywood Victory Caravan.

The song is featured in the 1951 musical film An American in Paris. Gene Kelly sang the song and tap-danced, while French-speaking children whom he had just taught a few words of English shouted the words "I got" each time they appeared in the lyrics. This version finished at #32 in AFI's 100 Years...100 Songs survey of top tunes in American cinema.

It is also featured in the film Mr. Holland's Opus, during a scene in which students are trying out for a Gershwin revue, and in the movie My Girl, during a dinner scene in which the grandmother sings it, oblivious of the other characters.

An extensive list of notable singers have recorded this song. The most popular versions are those of The Happenings (#3 on the US charts in 1967), Judy Garland, Ethel Merman, Ella Fitzgerald and, more recently, Jodi Benson.

It is a very popular jazz standard. Many songs use its chord progression, such as Duke Ellington's "Cotton Tail". Charlie Parker alone based many songs on its chord progression, such as "Moose the Mooche". Gary Larson referenced the song in the Far Side.

In 1939, I Got Rhythm was arranged and orchestrated by Bruce Chase for a premiere performance by the Kansas Philharmonic, now the Kansas City Symphony.

A version of the song set to a disco beat was recorded by Ethel Merman for her Ethel Merman Disco Album in 1979.

In 1992, the show Crazy for You featured the song sung by Jodi Benson.

Another version of the song was arranged for solo guitar by Ton Van Bergeyk. It appears on the album Black and Tan Fantasy. Mike Oldfield and Wendy Roberts performed a version on Oldfield's Platinum album.

The song was satirized in an episode of The Muppet Show where Rowlf and Fozzie attempt to perform it but Fozzie is unable to keep in tempo. To compensate, Rowlf has him change the lyrics to "I don't got rhythm".

The song has appeared in several film versions of Girl Crazy:
Girl Crazy (1932), performed by Kitty Kelly
Girl Crazy (1943), performed by Judy Garland and Mickey Rooney with Six Hits and a Miss, The Music Maids and Tommy Dorsey with his OrchestraWhen the Boys Meet the Girls (1965), performed by Harve Presnell and Connie Francis

 Other recordings 
 George Gershwin – 1931
 Louis Armstrong – 1931
 Casa Loma Orchestra – 1933
 Duke Ellington
 Jimmy Dorsey and his Orchestra – 1937
 Benny Goodman – 1938
 Metronome All Stars (Count Basie, Benny Carter, Benny Goodman) – 1942
 Esquire All Stars (Louis Armstrong, Roy Eldridge, Art Tatum) – 1944
 Jazz at the Philharmonic (Coleman Hawkins, Charlie Parker, Lester Young) – 1946
 Willie "The Lion" Smith – 1949
 The Happenings – Psycle (1967)
 Bing Crosby included the song in his 1976 album At My Time of Life.
 Ethel Merman – including a disco version for The Ethel Merman Disco Album (1979)
 Mike Oldfield (with Wendy Roberts) arranged the song as a ballad - Platinum (1979)
 Stephane Grappelli and McCoy Tyner – One on One (1990)
 Thelonious Monk
 Red Nichols
 Charlie Parker
 Hiromi's Sonicbloom – Beyond Standard (2008)
 The Puppini Sisters – Hollywood (2011)
 Ethel Waters
 Tony Glausi - My Favorite Tunes (2020) 

See also
List of 1930s jazz standards
Thirty-two-bar form

 References 

 Sources 
Greenberg, Rodney (1998). George Gershwin. Phaidon Press. .
Gershwin, George (1996). The Complete Gershwin Keyboard Works''. Warner Brothers Publications.  .

1930 songs
1930s jazz standards
1967 singles
Songs with music by George Gershwin
Songs with lyrics by Ira Gershwin
Songs from Girl Crazy
Ella Fitzgerald songs
Barbra Streisand songs
Jazz compositions in B-flat major
Cashbox number-one singles